Maximiliano Aguilar (born 25 May 1950) is a Mexican former swimmer. He competed in the men's 100 metre butterfly at the 1968 Summer Olympics and in the water polo at the 1972 Summer Olympics and the 1976 Summer Olympics.

References

External links
 

1950 births
Living people
Mexican male swimmers
Mexican male water polo players
Olympic swimmers of Mexico
Olympic water polo players of Mexico
Swimmers at the 1968 Summer Olympics
Water polo players at the 1972 Summer Olympics
Water polo players at the 1976 Summer Olympics
Swimmers from Mexico City
Pan American Games gold medalists for Mexico
Pan American Games bronze medalists for Mexico
Pan American Games medalists in water polo
Water polo players at the 1971 Pan American Games
Water polo players at the 1975 Pan American Games
Medalists at the 1971 Pan American Games
Medalists at the 1975 Pan American Games
20th-century Mexican people
21st-century Mexican people